Patrick Gumphrey Kenelly (October 7, 1922 – December 12, 2000) was an American football and baseball coach and college athletics administrator. He served as the eighth head football coach at  Southeastern Louisiana University in Hammond, Louisiana and he held that position for seven seasons, from 1965 until 1971, compiling a record of 25–43.

Kenelly was also the head baseball coach at Southeastern Louisiana from 1951 to 1964.  His tenure was the longest of any head coach in the history of the Southeastern Louisiana Lions baseball program.  Southeastern Louisiana's baseball facility, Pat Kenelly Diamond at Alumni Field, is named for him.  The diamond was dedicated on February 19, 2006.

Head coaching record

Football

References

External links
 Pat Kenelly's obituary
 

1922 births
2000 deaths
Southeastern Louisiana Lions and Lady Lions athletic directors
Southeastern Louisiana Lions baseball coaches
Southeastern Louisiana Lions football coaches
Southeastern Louisiana Lions football players
High school football coaches in Louisiana
People from Bogalusa, Louisiana
People from Walthall County, Mississippi
Players of American football from Louisiana